Bob and Mike Bryan were the defending champions and winners of six of the last ten tournaments, but chose not to compete in this year's competition.

Mark Knowles and Xavier Malisse won this tournament, by defeating Somdev Devvarman and Treat Conrad Huey in the final, 7–6(7–3), 7–6(12–10). They were the first non-American doubles champions since 2002.

Seeds

Draw

Draw

External links
 Main draw

Farmers Classic - Doubles
2011 Doubles